Uroš Đurić (Serbian Cyrillic: Урош Ђурић; born 1 December 1993) is a Serbian football goalkeeper who plays for FC Struga.

References

External links
 
 Profile at srbijafudbal.com 

Living people
1993 births
Footballers from Belgrade
Serbian footballers
Association football goalkeepers
Serbian First League players
Macedonian First Football League players
Serbian SuperLiga players
FK Sloboda Užice players
FK Dinamo Vranje players
FK Renova players